Bulo Marer, also written as Bulomarer, is a town in the southwestern Lower Shebelle region of Somalia. It was a base of Al-Shabaab, and was the site of an ill-fated 2013 military operation during which French commandos attempted to free a French hostage that was being held by the insurgent group.
The town was taken by Somali government forces assisted by AMISOM troops after a battle on August 30, 2014. It was the site of the 2018 African Union base attack in Bulo Marer.

Notes

References
Buulo Mareer

Populated places in Lower Shebelle